The 2010 FIBA Europe Under-18 Championship Division B was an international basketball  competition held in Israel in 2010.

Final ranking

1.  Czech Republic

2.  Finland

3.  Montenegro

4.  Israel

5.  Estonia

6.  England

7.  Belgium

8.  Bosnia and Herzegovina

9.  Belarus

10.  Austria

11.  Switzerland

12.  Netherlands

13.  Hungary

14.  Scotland

15.  Denmark

16.  Luxembourg

17.  Slovakia

18.  Portugal

19.  Georgia

20.  Romania

Awards

External links
FIBA Archive

FIBA U18 European Championship Division B
2010–11 in European basketball
2010–11 in Israeli basketball
International youth basketball competitions hosted by Israel